Demetric Felton, Jr. (born July 16, 1998) is an American football running back for the Cleveland Browns of the National Football League (NFL). He played college football at UCLA. He was named second-team all-conference in the Pac-12 in 2020.

Early years
Felton attended Great Oak High School in Temecula, California. As a senior he rushed for 1,347 yards on 166 carries and 14 touchdowns. He committed to the University of California, Los Angeles (UCLA) to play college football.

College career
After redshirting in his first year at UCLA in 2016, Felton played in 12 games in 2017, recording 75 yards on 10 carries and one touchdown. He played wide receiver in 2018 and started eight of 12 games, with 20 receptions for 207 yards and a touchdown. In 2019, he rushed 86 times for 331 yards and a touchdown and caught 55 passes for 594 yards and four touchdowns.

After Joshua Kelley departed for the NFL, Felton took over as UCLA's starting running back in 2020. He had career highs of 32 carries and 206 yards in a 27–10 win over Arizona. Due to an unspecified injury, he did not play in the season finale against Stanford. He ended the season as the fourth-leading rusher in the Pac-12 with 111.3 yards per game and five touchdowns. He was named second-team All-Pac-12.

Professional career

On May 1, 2021, Felton was selected by the Cleveland Browns with the 211th overall pick in the 2021 NFL Draft. He signed his four-year rookie contract on May 13, 2021. Felton had a productive training camp as a running back, receiver and kick returner.

He scored his first professional touchdown on September 19, 2021 against the Houston Texans.

NFL career statistics

Regular season

References

External links

UCLA Bruins bio

Living people
1998 births
Cleveland Browns players
African-American players of American football
Sportspeople from Temecula, California
Players of American football from Memphis, Tennessee
Players of American football from California
American football running backs
American football wide receivers
UCLA Bruins football players
21st-century African-American sportspeople